Expectancy effect may refer to:

Observer-expectancy effect
Subject-expectancy effect